The Libertarian Party of Russia is a libertarian political party in the Russian Federation founded in 2008 based on "self-ownership and non-aggression". The party has had two members elected to local office, one in Moscow and the other in Moscow Oblast. The first, Vera Kichanova, was elected in 2012 to the municipal council of the Yuzhnoye Tushino District of Moscow. The second, Andrey Shalnev, was elected in 2014 as an independent deputy councilman for the Pushkinsky District. The party coordinates the Adam Smith Forum (an annual international libertarian conference in Moscow), participates in the organization of the Free People's Forum (which discusses Russian politics), and runs other activities and publications, including a monthly newspaper and a podcast series.

Since 2017, the SVTV YouTube channel of Mikhail Svetov, a member of the Federal party Committee, has become very popular. The independent activity of regional offices has significantly increased. As of June 2017, the party had just over 1,000 members, including about 200 in the Moscow branch.

In 2020, there was a split in the party. Today there are two different organizations calling themselves the Libertarian Party of Russia and using the same symbols.

See also 
 Democratic Union (Russia)
 Russian Libertarian Movement

References

External links 
  
 Official website  (archive)

2007 establishments in Russia
Anarcho-capitalist organizations
Liberal parties in Russia
Libertarian parties
Libertarianism in Russia
Minarchism
Non-interventionist parties
Opposition to Vladimir Putin
Political parties established in 2007
Political parties in Russia
Political organizations based in Russia